Kevin Chumsy Okumu Otieno is a Kenyan defender currently in the ranks of Kenyan Premier League side KCB. The right-back cum right-winger formerly turned out for FC Kariobangi Sharks, Young Rovers, Wazito F.C. and Nairobi City Stars.

Career
Kevin was in the junior ranks of FC Kariobangi Sharks until 2016 before joining local side Young Rovers FC. He arrived at Nairobi City Stars in mid-2016, and went on to complete the 2017, 2018, 2018/19, and 2019/20 seasons.

He moved to Wazito F.C. in July 2020 and made his premier league debut in a 2020-21 FKF Premier League season opener against FC Kariobangi Sharks in Kasarani. 

He returned to Nairobi City Stars in February 2021 on loan for the second part of the season before making the move permanent at the end of the season. He moved to KCB at the end of the 2021–22 FKF Premier League season.

Honours

Club
Nairobi City Stars
National Super League
 Champions (1): 2019-20

References

External links

1998 births
Living people
Kenyan footballers
Nairobi City Stars players
Wazito F.C. players
Kenyan Premier League players